Madou Dossama (born 24 July 1972) is a retired Burkinabé footballer who played for Etoile Filante Ouagadougou and the national team.

Career
Dossama captained his club side EFO to the 1/16-finals of the 2004 CAF Confederation Cup, and became an assistant coach after he retired from playing.

He was part of the Burkinabé 2000 and 2002 African Nations Cup teams, who finished bottom of their groups in the first round of competition, thus failing to secure qualification for the quarter-finals.

References

External links

1972 births
Living people
Burkinabé footballers
Burkina Faso international footballers
2000 African Cup of Nations players
2002 African Cup of Nations players
Étoile Filante de Ouagadougou players
Association football midfielders
21st-century Burkinabé people